The 3 L'il Pigs is a 2007 Canadian French-language comedy film. The directorial debut of comedian and actor Patrick Huard, the film won the Golden Reel Award at the 28th Genie Awards and the Billet d'or at the Jutra Awards as top-grossing film of 2007 in Quebec.

A sequel, The 3 L'il Pigs 2, was released in 2016.

Plot
Two brothers (Legault, Lemay-Thivierge) discuss the positive and negative aspects of adultery as their mother lies beside them in a coma, while their brother Rémi (Doucet) attempts to discourage them. Their conversations become more explicit as time passes.

A scene in the film reveals that Rémi is bisexual and in the closet, a storyline which is explored in more depth in the sequel.

Awards
 Genie Award for Best Performance by an Actor in a Leading Role - Claude Legault - nominee
 Genie Award for Best Performance by an Actor in a Supporting Role - Guillaume Lemay-Thivierge - nominee
 Genie Award for Best Original Screenplay - Pierre Lamothe, Claude Lalonde - nominees
 Genie Award for Best Achievement in Editing - Jean-François Bergeron - nominee

Sequel

A sequel was released in 2016, from the same writers but directed by Jean-François Pouliot. While Guillaume Lemay-Thivierge, Paul Doucet,  and Isabel Richer all reprised their roles, Claude Legault didn't, so Mathieu was instead played by Patrice Robitaille.

Remake
A French remake entitled The Big Bad Wolf (Le Grand Méchant Loup in French speaking markets) was released in 2013. The film was written and directed by filmmaking duo Nicolas & Bruno and stars Benoît Poelvoorde, Kad Merad, Fred Testot, Valérie Donzelli, Charlotte Le Bon, Zabou Breitman, Cristiana Reali, Léa Drucker and Linh Dan Pham among others.

References

External links
 
 
 

2007 films
2000s sex comedy films
Canadian sex comedy films
2000s French-language films
Canadian LGBT-related films
LGBT-related comedy films
2007 LGBT-related films
Quebec films
Male bisexuality in film
2007 directorial debut films
2007 comedy films
Adultery in films
French-language Canadian films
2000s Canadian films